All Hail to Thee is a studio album by American band Znowhite.

Track listing 

 Sledgehammer	
 Saturday Night	
 Somethin' for Nothin'
 Bringin' the Hammer Down	
 Do or Die
 Never Felt Like This
 Rock City Destination

Personnel
 Ian Tafoya - Guitars, Bass	
 Sparks Tafoya	- Drums
 Nicole Lee - Vocals

References

Znowhite albums
1984 albums
Roadrunner Records albums
Speed metal albums